The Rivals or She, He and Andersson (Swedish: Hon, han och Andersson) is a 1926 Swedish comedy film directed by Gustaf Edgren and starring Vera Schmiterlöw, Nils Ohlin and Fridolf Rhudin. It was shot at the Råsunda Studios in Stockholm. The film's sets were designed by the art director Vilhelm Bryde.

Cast
 Vera Schmiterlöw as 	Maud
 Nils Ohlin as 	Harry Bergfeldt
 Fridolf Rhudin as 	Emil Andersson
 Edit Ernholm as 	Augusta
 Sture Baude as 	Sven Rinkow
 Mona Geijer-Falkner as 	Nea Rinkow
 Georg Blomstedt as 	Patrik Johansson
 Mathias Taube as Claes Gadd
 Erik Johansson as 	Actor
 Carl-Gunnar Wingård as 	Actor
 Wictor Hagman as 	Gentleman 
 Hugo Lundström as Johan

References

Bibliography
 Gustafsson, Tommy. Masculinity in the Golden Age of Swedish Cinema: A Cultural Analysis of 1920s Films. McFarland, 2014.

External links

1926 films
1926 comedy films
Swedish comedy films
Swedish silent feature films
Swedish black-and-white films
Films directed by Gustaf Edgren
1920s Swedish-language films
Silent comedy films
1920s Swedish films